The 2012 Netball Superleague Grand Final featured Northern Thunder and Surrey Storm. It was the first grand final not to feature either Team Bath or Mavericks. Northern Thunder won their first Superleague title.

Route to the Final

Match summary

Teams

References

2012 Netball Superleague season
2012
Surrey Storm matches
Manchester Thunder matches
Netball Superleague